The Fourteenth Amendment of the Constitution Act 1992 (previously bill no. 26 of 1992) is an amendment to the Constitution of Ireland which specified that the protection of the right to life of the unborn does not limit the right to distribute information about services in foreign countries. It was approved by referendum on 25 November 1992 and signed into law on 23 December of the same year.

On 25 May 2018, a referendum was passed to replace the current provisions on the right to life of the unborn, on travel and on information with a clause allowing legislation on the termination of pregnancy.

Background
The Society for the Protection of Unborn Children had successfully obtained two injunctions affecting the availability of information on abortion services outside of the state. In Attorney General (Society for the Protection of Unborn Children (Ireland) Ltd.) v Open Door Counselling Ltd. and Dublin Wellwoman Centre Ltd. (1988), an injunction was granted restraining two counseling agencies from assisting women to travel abroad to obtain abortions or informing them of the methods of communications with such clinics, and in Society for the Protection of Unborn Children (Ireland) Ltd. v Grogan (1989), an injunction was granted restraining three students' unions from distributing information in relation to abortion available outside the state. The Fourteenth Amendment overturned these judgments and allowed for information on abortion under terms regulated by law.

On the same day, two referendums were held in response to aspects of the Supreme Court decision in the X Case decided in March 1992: the Twelfth Amendment which would have excluded the risk of suicide as grounds for an abortion, which was defeated, and the Thirteenth Amendment, to permit travel outside of the state to obtain an abortion, which was approved. These three referendums were held on the same day as the 1992 general election.

Changes to the text
Insertion of a new paragraph in Article 40.3.3º:

The subsection relating to abortion had originally been added with the Eighth Amendment in 1983. With the approval of the Thirteenth Amendment and the Fourteenth Amendment, the full text of Article 40.3.3º read as the follows:

Oireachtas debates
A previous amendment to the constitution had been proposed in a private member's bill by Labour Party TD Brendan Howlin on 12 May 1992. This proposed to insert the following subsection after Article 40.3.3º:

This was defeated at Second Stage the following day by 62 votes to 67.

The Fourteenth Amendment was proposed in the Dáil by Minister for Justice Pádraig Flynn on 21 October 1992. It was passed in the Dáil on 22 October and in the Seanad on 30 October. It then proceeded to a referendum on 25 November.

Result

Aftermath
The legislation anticipated by the Fourteenth Amendment was provided for in the Regulation of Information (Services Outside the State For Termination of Pregnancies) Act 1995. This bill was referred by the President to the Supreme Court prior to its enactment, which upheld it as constitutional, having assigned counsel to argue that it provided inadequate protection to the life of the unborn, and counsel to argue that it provided inadequate protection to the rights of a woman. It was found to be constitutional and signed into law on 12 May 1995.

Repeal
On 25 May 2018, the Thirty-sixth Amendment of the Constitution Bill 2018 was passed by referendum. After it was signed into law, it replaced the previous text of Article 40.3.3º with the following text:

See also
Politics of the Republic of Ireland
History of the Republic of Ireland
Constitutional amendment
Amendments to the Constitution of Ireland
November 1992 Irish constitutional referendum

References

External links
Fourteenth Amendment of the Constitution Act 1992
Referendum (Amendment) (No. 2) Act 1992
Regulation of Information (Services Outside the State For Termination of Pregnancies) Act 1995
Full text of the Constitution of Ireland
Oireachtas Debates: Fourteenth Amendment of the Constitution Bill 1992

1992 in Irish law
1992 in Irish politics
1992 referendums
14
14
14
14
November 1992 events in Europe
1992 in women's history
Amendment, 14